Global Association of International Sports Federations (GAISF) is the umbrella organisation for all (Olympic and non-Olympic) international sports federations as well as organisers of multi-sports games and sport-related international associations. It changed its name to SportAccord from March 2009 to April 2017 when it reverted to its former name. GAISF is an international sport organisation with 95 full members (international sports federations governing specific sports worldwide) and 20 associate members (organisations which conduct activities closely related to the international sports federations). 

In November 2022 Members of the Global Association of International Sports Federations (GAISF) voted for the dissolution of the organisation, with many of its activities taken by a restructured SportAccord. The revised governance structure of Sport Accord will see the Association of IOC Recognised International Sports Federations (ARISF) and Alliance of Independent Recognised Members of Sport (AIMS) join the Association of Summer Olympic International Federations (ASOIF) and the Association of International Olympic Winter Sports Federations (AIOWF) as Members of SportAccord.

GAISF Council
The council is composed of a president, two vice-presidents, a treasurer and five members.

Mission and values
GAISF is the umbrella organisation for both Olympic and non-Olympic international sports federations, as well as organisers of international sporting events. In this role it provides expertise in, for example, anti-doping, integrity and social responsibility.
By establishing multi-sports games that group together similar sports, GAISF aims to promote the members and the members' visibility.

Membership
Member international federations can be either full or associate members of GAISF.

History
GAISF is deeply rooted in the sports movement. As early as 1921, international sports federations (IFs) expressed the need for a representative of their common objectives and interests. Under the direction of Paul Rousseau, Secretary General of the Union Cycliste Internationale (UCI), a permanent bureau of the IFs was established to facilitate dialogue with the Olympic authorities.

In 1967, 26 international sports federations met in Lausanne, agreed on the need to increase permanent liaisons, and adopted the name, “General Assembly of International Sports Federations”. In order to establish a more formalised organisation, the “General Association of International Sports Federations" (GAISF) was formed in 1976, and the headquarters were moved to Monaco two years later.

The new millennium brought important changes to the organisation. Reacting to the increasing pressure on IFs to professionalise and develop, GAISF, in collaboration with the Associations of Summer and Winter Olympic International Federations (ASOIF and AIOWF), launched the first SportAccord International Convention in 2003. This new format “by sport for sport” allowed IFs and sports business to get together, share knowledge and network.

In March 2009, GAISF was rebranded SportAccord and, in the same year, its offices moved from Monaco to Lausanne, the Olympic capital. SportAccord adopted the motto "Unite & Support" with the aim to serve and promote its members. Its ambition is to provide high-quality services and expertise in areas that are of most importance to its members.

In April 2017, following the former president Marius Vizer's controversial attack against IOC president Thomas Bach during the opening SportAccord's 2015 convention in Sochi and his subsequent resignation, the organisation rebranded back to GAISF under its new president Patrick Baumann.

In May 2019, Raffaele Chiulli was unanimously elected as GAISF President in Gold Coast, Australia

1920s

As early as 1921, under the direction of Paul Rousseau, Secretary General of the “Union Cycliste Internationale”, a permanent bureau of the international sports federations (IFs) was created. With regular IFs/IOC meetings taking place, dialogue with the Olympic authorities became easier. However, organisations that were not part of the Olympic movement were excluded.

1960s

In the 1960s, the sports movement evolved rapidly. Roger Coulon, President of the “Fédération Internationale de Lutte Amateur”, was the first to express the need for a wider recognition of the role of IFs. For non-Olympic federations, a forum that would enable them to better express their points of view was necessary. The creation of a stable organisation ensuring permanent relations between IFs appeared to be the logical continuation of their meetings, which had taken place frequently but without rules or a fixed organisation. The common preparation of these meetings with the IOC could thus be better supported. It also permitted a constant liaison between the IFs and the general population. In 1966, the time seemed appropriate, and the conversion to the newly constituted Assembly was launched.

1967

On 21–23 April 1967, delegates from the following 26 international sports federations met in Lausanne in the Hotel Continental: Aeronautics, Rowing, Basketball, Bobsleigh, Boules, Canoeing, Cycling, Equestrian, Fencing, Gymnastics, Handball, Hockey, Ice Hockey, Judo, Luge, Wrestling, Motorcycling, Swimming, Modern Pentathlon, Roller Skating, Skiing, Shooting, Volleyball, Weightlifting, University Sport, and Maccabi.

The delegates agreed on the necessity to establish permanent liaisons between the IFs for the defence of their objectives and common goals, the preservation of their autonomy, and constant exchange of information. The name “General Assembly of International Sports Federations” was adopted.

In 1976, this name was replaced by “General Association of International Sports Federations” (GAISF). In 1978, the office moved from Lausanne to Monaco. GAISF represented the extension of the past meetings of the IFs, dealing not only with Olympic matters, but also with all questions of common interest for the IFs.

2000s

In 2003, in collaboration with ASOIF and AIOWF, GAISF launched the first SportAccord Convention to answer a need of the IFs, which were looking for a “one-stop shop” where they could hold their annual meetings, be encouraged to network and share their knowledge.

In March 2009, GAISF was rebranded SportAccord at the meeting of the 7th SportAccord International Convention in Denver. In April 2009, it moved its main office from Monaco to Maison du Sport International in Lausanne, Switzerland.

On 25 May 2012, the last of eight days of the annual General Assembly of SportAccord in Quebec City, the Federation of International Lacrosse and the International Mind Sports Association were accepted, bringing the number of SportAccord members to 107.

On 31 May 2013, the last of eight days of the annual General Assembly of SportAccord in Saint Petersburg, the International Cheer Union and the Federation Internationale de l'Automobile were voted into SportAccord.

On 20 April 2015, at SportAccord's 2015 convention in Sochi, SportAccord president Marius Vizer made a speech that was sharply critical of the IOC and its president, Thomas Bach.  Following the speech, the IAAF (now known as World Athletics), the ISSF, and World Archery withdrew from SportAccord in protest, and there were a number of further withdrawals in May 2015, including the International Rowing Federation.

At the 2017 convention in Aarhus, Federation Internationale du Sport Universitaire (FISU) and Federation of International Bandy (FIB) became full members and SportAccord was renamed GAISF.

By the end of 2018, The World ArmWrestling Federation (WAF) was the new addition to the GAISF Full Member List along with 4 Associate Members – World Olympics Association, International Sports Press Association, World Union of Olympic Cities and World Federation of the Sporting Goods Industry

Member federations

Associate members
Multi-Sports

Association of Paralympic Sports Organisations (APSO)
Commonwealth Games: Commonwealth Games Federation (CGF)
Masters Games: International Masters Games Association (IMGA)
Mediterranean Games: International Committee of Mediterranean Games (ICMG or CIJM)
Military World Games: Conseil International du Sport Militaire (CISM)
World Mind Sports Games: International Mind Sports Association (IMSA)
World Transplant Games Federation (WTGF)
Paralympic Games: International Paralympic Committee (IPC)
School Sports: International School Sport Federation (ISF)
Special Olympics: Special Olympics (SOI)
Sports for the Deaf: International Committee of Sports for the Deaf (CISS)
The World Games: International World Games Association (IWGA)
CSIT World Sports Games: International Workers and Amateurs in Sports Confederation (CSIT)

Other

European broadcasting: European Broadcasting Union (EBU / UER)
Panathlon: Panathlon International (PI)
World Olympians Association (WOA)
Sports chiropractic: Federation Internationale de Chiropratique du Sport (FICS)
Sports facilities: International Association for Sports and Leisure Facilities (IAKS)
Sports medicine: International Federation of Sports Medicine (FIMS)
Sports journalism: International Sports Press Association (AIPS)
Olympic cities: World Union of Olympic Cities
Sporting Goods Industry: World Federation of the Sporting Goods Industry (WFSGI)

Observers 

The GAISF Observer Status can be requested by the Applicants to GAISF Membership interested to obtain support and guidance in their path to fulfil the GAISF Membership Criteria.

List of GAISF presidents

Current organizational structure

Summits
Originally launched in 2003, SportAccord World Sport & Business Summit is a gathering of more than 1,500 leading representatives from the sports industry. SportAccord is focused on driving positive change internationally and dedicated to engaging and connecting; international federations, rights holders, organising committees, cities, press and media, businesses and other organisations involved in the development of sport.

SportAccord is a not-for-profit organisation which annually brings together representatives from more than 100 International Sports Federations affiliated with the following umbrella organisations that host their Annual General Assemblies at SportAccord. Our event is an international sport convention hosted over a week, combining an exhibition area, a themed conference programme and a multitude of networking events.

SportAccord’s stakeholders include: ASOIF (Association of Summer Olympic International Federations), AIOWF (Association of International Olympic Winter Sports Federations), ARISF (Association of IOC Recognised International Sports Federations), AIMS (Alliance of Independent Recognised Members of Sport), GAISF (Global Association of International Sports Federations) and Associate Members. In addition, SportAccord receives the full support of the IOC (International Olympic Committee).

 Note 1: The 2020 SportAccord World Sport & Business Summit in Beijing was cancelled, due to the COVID-19 pandemic.
 Note 2: The 18th SportAccord World Sport & Business Summit was postponed from November 2021 to May 2022.
 Note 3: SportAccord summit in Yekaterinburg cancelled following Russian invasion of Ukraine.

See also
International Olympic Committee (IOC)
Association of Summer Olympic International Federations (ASOIF)
Association of International Olympic Winter Sports Federations (AIOWF)
Association of IOC Recognised International Sports Federations (ARISF)
International World Games Association (IWGA)
List of international sport federations
World Combat Games
SportAccord World Mind Games

Notes and references

External links
Home page
Official web site of SportAccord

Sports organizations established in 1967
International Olympic Committee
 SportAccord
Supraorganizations
Organisations based in Lausanne
International sports bodies based in Switzerland